Beyond the Pale is the sixth album released by American stand-up comedian Jim Gaffigan. It is best known for its "Hot Pockets" riff.

CD Release
The album was released on February 7, 2006, by Comedy Central Records, and was also released with the same title on DVD. The album was recorded at The Vic Theater in Lakeview, Chicago, Illinois. It peaked at #34 on the Billboard Independent Albums chart.

CD Track listing
Opening
I Love Food
Packaging
The Grocery Store
Eat Like an American
Fast Food
Delivery
Spray Cheese
The Case Against Cinnabons
Dessert
Cake
Holidays
Presents
Eat Vegetarian
Steak and Salad
Eat Healthy
Hot Pockets
Weird
Catholic
Heaven
Jesus, Mary and Joseph

DVD release
The special was also released on DVD, being the first Gaffigan stand-up performance available on home video. In addition to the main act, the DVD also contains over 30 minutes of bonus footage.

DVD Chapter Listing
Pre-Showtime Ritual
Opening
Love Food
Packaging *
Grocery Store *
Eat Like Americans
Fast Food *
Delivery
Cheese *
Cinnabon *
Dessert
Cake
Holidays
Presents
Eating Out *
Vegetarian
Steak N Salad *
Eat Healthy *
Hot Pockets
Film Director
Do Nothing *
Email *
Weird *
Catholic
Heaven
Jesus, Mary and Joseph

 *Not on TV special

DVD bonus features
Mr. Chicago – Jim tours Chicago on day of his DVD taping.
Eat Dinner with Jim – Enjoy a hot pocket with Jim.
First Stand Up Performance [01.27.91] – See Jim sweat!
How to Break Into Stand-Up Comedy – Jim plays a character with all the answers.
A Short Cartoon of Jim.
Jim Makes the News

References

Jim Gaffigan live albums
Stand-up comedy albums
Comedy Central Records live albums
Live spoken word albums
2006 video albums
Live video albums
Comedy Central Records video albums
2006 live albums
2000s comedy albums